William Dugald Carnie (29 June 1906 — 14 August 1980) was a Scottish first-class cricketer.

Carnie was born at Greenock in June 1906, where he was educated at Greenock Academy. A club cricketer for Greenock, he made a single appearance in first-class cricket for Scotland against Lancashire at Old Trafford in 1925. Batting twice in the match, he was dismissed in the Scotland first innings for 0 by Dick Tyldesley, while in their second innings he scored an unbeaten 6 runs. He also bowled nine wicketless overs with his right-arm fast-medium bowling in Lancashire's only innings of the match, which they won by an innings and 74 runs. He later emigrated to Canada, where he played club cricket for both Toronto and Montreal. Carnie died in August 1980 at Saint-Lambert, Quebec.

References

External links
 

1906 births
1980 deaths
Cricketers from Greenock
People educated at Greenock Academy
Scottish cricketers
Scottish emigrants to Canada